The Dayton Flyers women's basketball team is the NCAA Division 1 basketball team that represents University of Dayton in Dayton, Ohio. The school's team currently competes in the Atlantic 10 Conference. They are currently coached by Tamika Williams-Jeter. The Flyers play their home games at University of Dayton Arena where the official capacity for basketball games is 13,435.

History
The University of Dayton first sponsored women's basketball in 1968 playing in the NCAA's Division II until 1984.

During their tenure in Division II the team won the AIAW National Championship in 1980, was the national runner-up in 1979, as well as winning the 1982 AIAW Midwest Regional Championship, advancing to the NCAA Division II Final Four in 1984,  and winning the OAISW State Championship in 1977.

The team then joined the North Star conference in 1984 until moving to the Midwestern Collegiate Conference in 1988 to 1993. In 1995 they moved to the Atlantic 10 Conference where they still reside.

During their time in the Atlantic 10 Conference the team has made 7 NCAA Tournament appearances and 4 NIT appearances.

In 2014–2015 season the team made it to the Regional Finals (Elite 8), the farthest the team has ever gone in the tournament, defeating Iowa State, Kentucky, and Louisville, before losing to the eventual National Champion University of Connecticut Huskies.

The Flyers have won Atlantic 10 conference tournament championships in 2012, 2017, and 2020, and conference regular season championships in 2013, 2014, 2017, 2018, 2020, and 2021. They have advanced to the postseason following the last ten consecutive seasons.

Coaches
The Flyers have had 10 head coaches since their first season in 1968. The current coach was hired in 2022.

Current coaching staff

Postseason

NCAA Division I

AIAW College Division/Division II
The Flyers made five appearances in the AIAW National Division II basketball tournament, with a combined record of 7–4.

All-time statistical leaders

Current leaders

Single season leaders

Single game leaders

References

External links
 

 
Basketball teams established in 1968